Following is a list of elected members of the American Academy of Arts and Sciences.

List of American Academy of Arts and Sciences members (1953–1993)
List of American Academy of Arts and Sciences members (1994–2005)
List of American Academy of Arts and Sciences members (2006–2019)
List of American Academy of Arts and Sciences members (2020–2022)

References